MP banki was an investment bank in Iceland that operated from 2003 until 2015 when it became part of Kvika Banki.

History
The company was founded as MP Securities (Icelandic: MP Verðbréf hf) in 1999 by Margeir Pétursson together with Sverrir Kristinsson and Ágústi Sindra Karlsson.  They owned 10% each, while Margeir 80% shares.

The bank received an investment banking license in 2003 and started to offered a comprehensive investment banking service.  After the bank was licensed as an investment bank the name changed to MP Investment Bank (Icelandic: MP Fjárfestingarbanki hf).

In 2008, the bank received a commercial banking license and changed its name to MP banki. It became the only commercial bank in Iceland that did not collapse that year when the worldwide economic crisis hit the country.

MP banki and Straumur Investment Bank merged in July 2015 and the name changed to Kvika banki.

References

Banks of Iceland
Banks established in 1999
Defunct banks
Tavistock Group
1999 establishments in Iceland
Lithuanian companies established in 2007